Steyermarkochloeae is a tribe of the Panicoideae subfamily in the grasses (Poaceae), native to tropical South America. There are only two species in two genera, Arundoclaytonia and Steyermarkochloa. The tribe probably belongs to a basal lineage within the subfamily. Species in this tribe use the C3 photosynthetic pathway.

References

External links

Panicoideae
Poaceae tribes